The SP&S Class A-1 steam locomotives were a group of 5 identical locomotives. They were used in the rail yards at Portland, Oregon, and Vancouver, Washington, from 1907 to 1952. They were replaced with diesel-electric switch locomotives.

Background
In 1907, the new SP&S needed equipment for regular operations. Company officials wanted 25 freight locomotives and two switch locomotives to start with. The president of the Great Northern Railway advised SP&S officials that his railroad could contribute excess engines. Because of this, only five switch locomotives were purchased for use in the terminal yards in Portland and Vancouver.

Construction history
All five locomotives in Class A-1 were built by the Manchester plant of American Locomotive Company. Because of the availability of spare parts from the Northern Pacific Railway in Portland, OR, and Pasco and Vancouver, WA, these locomotives were identical to Northern Pacific class L-9 switch locomotives.

Operational history
All five locomotives were delivered to the SP&S in February 1908. They were initially used in work service completing the North Bank line from Portland to Spokane. Upon completion of the main line, these locomotives were transferred to the terminals for switching service. In late 1942 and early 1943 all 5 locomotives were assigned to the Portland Terminal yards as switch locomotives. In 1946 locomotive number 2 was sold to the City of Prineville Railway. With the arrival of SW9 switch engines 43-45 in 1951, the remaining A-1 class steamers were retired in 1952.

Numbering
These locomotives were numbered 1 to 5

Disposition
Locomotive number 1 was scrapped April 25, 1952. Locomotive number 2 was sold to the City of Prineville Railway and renumbered as their number 7 on July 31, 1946. Locomotive number 3 was scrapped January 24, 1952. Locomotive number 4 was scrapped April 25, 1951.  Locomotive number 5 was scrapped January 24, 1952.

References

A-1
0-6-0 locomotives
ALCO locomotives
Steam locomotives of the United States
Railway locomotives introduced in 1907
Standard gauge locomotives of the United States
Shunting locomotives